Pamela Ware (born February 12, 1993) is a Canadian diver. She is currently partnered with Jennifer Abel for synchronized diving. Ware has two bronze medals from the 2013 World Aquatics Championships where she won in the synchronized 3 m event with Abel and as well as individual bronze in the 3 m. She is also the silver medallist in the 3 m springboard at the 2015 Pan American Games, finishing second to Abel.

Career
Ware competed at the 2009 Canada Games where she won two individual gold medals as a competitor for Quebec. She won her first major international hardware when she won bronze together with partner Abel at the 2013 World Championships. She next won her second bronze medal in the 3 m solo competition, setting a personal best 350.25, her teammate Abel finished 5th.

Ware competed in the 2020 Olympics. In the 3 metre springboard, she aborted her dive and landed feet first, earning a score of zero and eliminating her from the finals. She said she avoided injury by aborting the dive after being out of rhythm.

References

External links
 Diving Plongeon Canada

1993 births
Living people
Francophone Quebec people
Canadian female divers
Divers at the 2010 Summer Youth Olympics
Sportspeople from Longueuil
Divers at the 2014 Commonwealth Games
Divers at the 2015 Pan American Games
Divers at the 2018 Commonwealth Games
World Aquatics Championships medalists in diving
Commonwealth Games silver medallists for Canada
Pan American Games silver medalists for Canada
Olympic divers of Canada
Divers at the 2016 Summer Olympics
Commonwealth Games medallists in diving
Pan American Games medalists in diving
Divers at the 2019 Pan American Games
Medalists at the 2015 Pan American Games
Medalists at the 2019 Pan American Games
Divers at the 2020 Summer Olympics
21st-century Canadian women
Medallists at the 2014 Commonwealth Games